Albert Clifton Ammons (March 1, 1907 – December 2, 1949) was an American pianist and player of boogie-woogie, a blues style popular from the late 1930s to the mid-1940s.

Life and career
Ammons was born in Chicago, Illinois. His parents were pianists, and he had learned to play by the age of ten. His interest in boogie-woogie is attributed to his close friendship with Meade Lux Lewis and also his father's interest in the style. Both Albert and Meade would practice together on the piano in the Ammons household. From the age of ten, Ammons learned about chords by marking the depressed keys on the family pianola (player piano) with a pencil and repeated the process until he had mastered it. He also played percussion in a drum and bugle corps as a teenager and was soon performing with bands in clubs in Chicago. After World War I he became interested in the blues, learning by listening to the Chicago pianists Hersal Thomas and the brothers Alonzo and Jimmy Yancey.

In the early to mid-1920s Ammons worked as a cab driver for the Silver Taxicab Company. In 1924 he met up with his boyhood friend Meade Lux Lewis, who was also then a taxi driver. Soon the two players began working as a team, performing at club parties. Ammons started his own band at the Club DeLisa in 1934 and remained at the club for the next two years.
During that time he played with a five-piece band that included Guy Kelly, Dalbert Bright, Jimmy Hoskins, and Israel Crosby. Ammons also recorded as Albert Ammons's Rhythm Kings for Decca Records in 1936. The Rhythm Kings' version of "Swanee River Boogie" sold a million copies, and their 1936 recording of "Boogie Woogie Stomp" has been described as "the first 12-bar piano based boogie-woogie, [which] was imitated by many jazz bands."

Ammons moved from Chicago to New York City, where he teamed up with another pianist, Pete Johnson. The two performed regularly at the Café Society, occasionally joined by Lewis or by other jazz musicians, including Benny Goodman and Harry James.

On December 23, 1938, Ammons appeared at Carnegie Hall with Johnson and Lewis in From Spirituals to Swing, a concert produced by John H. Hammond, which helped launch the boogie-woogie craze. Two weeks later, the record producer Alfred Lion, who had attended the concert, started Blue Note Records, recording nine Ammons solos, including "The Blues" and "Boogie Woogie Stomp", eight by Lewis and two duets in a one-day session in a rented recording studio.

In 1941, Ammons's boogie-woogie music was accompanied by drawn-on-film animation in the short film Boogie-Doodle, by Norman McLaren. Ammons played himself in the movie Boogie-Woogie Dream (1944), with Lena Horne and Johnson. As a sideman with Sippie Wallace in the 1940s Ammons recorded a session with his son, the tenor saxophonist Gene Ammons. Although the boogie-woogie fad began to die down in 1945, Ammons had no difficulty securing work. He continued to tour as a solo artist, and between 1946 and 1949 recorded his last sides, for Mercury Records, with the bassist Israel Crosby, and took on the position of staff pianist with the Lionel Hampton Orchestra. In 1949 he played at the inauguration of President Harry S. Truman.

During his last years, Ammons played mainly at the Beehive Club and the Tailspin Club in Chicago. Four days before he died, he had been at the Yancey apartment listening to Don Ewell and Jimmy Yancey play. Ammons could play only one song, having just regained the use of his hands after a temporary paralysis.

Ammons died of natural causes on December 2, 1949, in Chicago, around three months before his 43rd birthday. He was interred at the Lincoln Cemetery, at Kedzie Avenue in Blue Island, Worth Township, Cook County, Illinois.

Legacy
Ammons has had a wide influence on countless pianists, such as Jerry Lee Lewis, Dave Alexander, Dr. John, Hadda Brooks, Johnnie Johnson, Ray Bryant, Erroll Garner, Katie Webster, Axel Zwingenberger, Henri Herbert, Steve "Big Man" Clayton and the German pianist, Jörg Hegemann.  The latter honored Ammons, on the occasion of the 100th anniversary of Ammons' birth, with his album, A Tribute to Albert Ammons.

Discography

Notable songs
 "Boogie Woogie Stomp"
 "Boogie Woogie Prayer"
 "Shout for Joy"
 "Woo-Woo" (1939) (Columbia 35958, C44-2)

Selected albums

Bibliography
 Page, Christopher I. (1997). Boogie Woogie Stomp: Albert Ammons & His Music. .

See also
 List of blues musicians
 List of boogie woogie musicians
 List of jazz pianists
 List of Mercury Records artists

References

External links
 E-Notes: Albert Ammons
 BBC: Albert Ammons
 
 Jazz Police article on Albert Ammons Centennial Celebration
 1941 short film Boogie-Doodle
 
 The story of his life is retold in the radio drama "Of Blood and the BoogieFather to Son", a presentation from Destination Freedom

1907 births
1949 deaths
Boogie-woogie pianists
Swing pianists
American jazz pianists
American blues pianists
American male pianists
Musicians from Chicago
Mercury Records artists
Blue Note Records artists
Vocalion Records artists
Delmark Records artists
20th-century American pianists
Jazz musicians from Illinois
20th-century American male musicians
American male jazz musicians